The 1908 Wimbledon Championships took place on the outdoor grass courts at the All England Lawn Tennis and Croquet Club in Wimbledon, London, United Kingdom. The tournament ran from 22 June until 3 July. It was the 32nd staging of the Wimbledon Championships, and the first Grand Slam tennis event of 1908.

Champions

Men's singles

 Arthur Gore defeated  Herbert Roper Barrett  6–3, 6–2, 4–6, 3–6, 6–4

Women's singles

 Charlotte Sterry defeated  Agnes Morton  6–4, 6–4

Men's doubles

 Major Ritchie /  Anthony Wilding defeated  Herbert Roper Barrett /  Arthur Gore, 6–1, 6–2, 1–6, 9–7

References

External links
 Official Wimbledon Championships website

 
Wimbledon Championships
Wimbledon Championships
Wimbledon Championships
Wimbledon Championships